Catharesthes elegans is a species of longhorn beetles (insects in the family Cerambycidae); It is the only species in the genus Catharesthes.

References 

Acanthocinini
Monotypic Cerambycidae genera